Jana Novotná was the defending champion, but chose not to compete that year.

Mary Pierce won the title, defeating Monica Seles in the final 7–6(7–2), 6–3.

Seeds
A champion seed is indicated in bold text while text in italics indicates the round in which that seed was eliminated. The top four seeds received a bye to the second round.

  Venus Williams (semifinals)
  Monica Seles (final)
  Conchita Martínez (quarterfinals)
  Patty Schnyder (second round)
  Mary Pierce (champion)
  Anna Kournikova (first round)
  Sandrine Testud (semifinals)
  Irina Spîrlea (first round)

Draw

Final

Section 1

Section 2

External links
 1998 MGTS Kremlin Cup draw

Kremlin Cup
Kremlin Cup